Innokentyevka is a rural locality (a selo) and the administrative center of Innokentyevsky Selsoviet of Zavitinsky District, Amur Oblast, Russia. The population was 239 as of 2018. There are 8 streets.

Geography 
Innokentyevka is located 29 km southwest of Zavitinsk (the district's administrative centre) by road. Ivanovka is the nearest rural locality.

References 

Rural localities in Zavitinsky District